Guorong Wang (Chinese: 王国荣, born 1940) is a Chinese mathematician, working in the area of generalized inverses of matrices. He is a Professor and first Dean of Mathematics & Science College of Shanghai Normal University, Shanghai, China.

Research 
Wang has been conducting teaching and research in generalized inverses of matrices since 1976. He taught "Generalized Inverses of Matrices" and held many seminars for graduate students majoring in Computational Mathematics in Math department of Shanghail Normal University. Since 1979, he and his students have obtained a number of results on generalized inverses in the areas of perturbation theory, condition numbers, recursive algorithms, finite algorithms, imbedding algorithms, parallel algorithms, generalized inverses of rank-r modified matrices and Hessenberg matrices, extensions of the Cramer rules and the representation and approximation of generalized inverses of linear operators. More than 100 papers are published in refereed journals in China and other countries, including 25 papers in SCI journals such as LAA, AMC etc. His two monographs in generalized inverses, one in Chinese and the other in English, have been adopted by several universities as textbooks or references books for graduate students.

Publications 

 Introduction to Matrix Computations, (Chinese Translation with others, original author G.W. Stewart), Shanghai Science and Technology Publishing House, 1980
 An Introduction to Numerical Analysis, (Chinese Translation with Jiaoxun Kuang and others, original author K. E. Atkinson), Shanghai Science and Technology Publishing House, 1985
 Generalized Inverses of Matrices and Operators, (In Chinese, Author), Science Press, 1994, 1998
 College Mathematics (1), (In Chinese, Editor), East-China Normal University Press, 2001
 College Mathematics (2), (In Chinese, Editor), East-China Normal University Press, 2002
 Generalized Inverses: Theory and Computations, (In English, Author with Yimin Wei & Sanzheng Qiao), Science Press, 2004, 2018 & Springer, 2018
 Numerical Analysis, (Chinese Translation with others, original authors D. Kincaid & W. Cheney), China Machinery Industry Press, 2005
 Applied Numerical Linear Algebra, (Chinese Translation, original author J. Demmel), Posts & Telecom Press, 2007
 Elementary Numerical Analysis, (Chinese Translation with others, original authors K. E. Atkinson & W. Han), Posts & Telecom Press, 2009

References

External links 
 Guorong Wang at the Mathematics Genealogy Project
 Guorong Wang at the DBLP

Living people
1940 births
Date of birth missing (living people)
Place of birth missing (living people)
20th-century Chinese mathematicians
21st-century Chinese mathematicians
Academic staff of Shanghai Normal University